The 2017–18 Philadelphia 76ers season was the 69th season of the franchise in the National Basketball Association (NBA). The team was 25–25 after the first 50 games, but finished the remainder of the season with a 27-5 record. It was the team's first 50-win season since 2000–01, when they last made the NBA Finals. The Sixers closed the regular season on a 16-game winning streak, a franchise record as well as becoming the only team in NBA history to end the regular season with 16 consecutive wins in the process (the winning streak continued in the playoffs, but was ended at 17 when the Miami Heat defeated them in Game 2 of the First Round).

The Sixers had acquired the first overall draft pick from the Boston Celtics on June 19, four days before the 2017 NBA draft began in exchange for their third overall draft pick that year (which became Jayson Tatum) and another first round pick in 2019, their own or the Kings which ever is better (Sixers would get the pick if it was #1 overall). They used the 2017 first overall pick to select Markelle Fultz, who missed most of his rookie season due to injuries.

Center Joel Embiid became the first Sixers All-Star since Jrue Holiday in 2013.

They finished the regular season with 52–30 record, which clinched the third seed. In the playoffs, the 76ers faced the sixth-seeded Miami Heat in the First Round, and won in five games, advancing to the Conference Semifinals, where they faced their rivals, the Boston Celtics, losing in five games. It was the 20th meeting in the NBA Playoffs for these two franchises.

Draft picks

The Sixers ended the 2016–17 season with the fourth best NBA Draft Lottery odds and also due to trades had a chance to have the Lakers pick, which had the third-best odds of staying in the Top 3, as well as held the possibility to swap picks with the Sacramento Kings, depending on whether Sacramento moved ahead of them or not. It ended with them having the third pick of the 2017 NBA Draft thanks to the Sacramento Kings, while the Kings would end up with the fifth pick of the draft and the Lakers kept their pick as the second pick of the draft. Philadelphia would also have four different second round picks this year, with none of them being their original pick due to the aforementioned trade with Sacramento, but all of their second round picks would be acquired from the previous season via trades. Two of their second round picks were the incentive of trading away Kendall Marshall to the Utah Jazz, where Philadelphia would acquire the best and worst of four different draft picks this year. Another second round pick would be had in a trade deadline deal (alongside the incentive to swap their worst second round pick they acquired from Utah with the Atlanta Hawks) which included champion power forward/center Tiago Splitter in exchange for Ersan İlyasova. Their last second round pick would be acquired from the Dallas Mavericks, where they would have the Mavericks' second round pick this year and in 2020 and Justin Anderson in exchange for center/power forward Nerlens Noel. On June 19, three days before the day of the 2017 NBA Draft began, the 76ers would swap Duke University's Jayson Tatum, their #3 pick with the Boston Celtics (as well as either the Los Angeles Lakers' 2018 first round pick or the Sacramento Kings' 2019 first round pick as long as it isn't the #1 pick in 2019) in exchange for Boston's #1 pick, which ultimately became Markelle Fultz.

As the consensus #1 pick of the draft that year, Fultz showed off a considerable display during his freshman season at the University of Washington. While Markelle wound up being in a rather similar situation that his teammate and former #1 draft pick Ben Simmons had back at Louisiana State University before the 2016 NBA Draft, he did display some of the absolute best efforts he could have possibly provided Washington in what was otherwise a losing season for them. At his only season in Washington, Fultz provided an outstanding stat line of 23.2 points, 5.9 assists, 5.7 rebounds, 1.6 steals, and 1.2 blocks per game in only 25 games played for them; not only would those statistics be some of the best recorded in Pac-12 history in over 20 years (around the time the division was named the Pac-10), but he also was the first freshman to be named to record averages of at least 20 points, 5 rebounds, and 5 assists per game since LaDrell Washington back in the 1994-95 season. Under such results, he would obviously not only be named a member of the All-Pac-12 First Team, but also be considered a consensus All-American Third Team member for the effort he made to help Washington become competitive in spite of a losing season otherwise. On draft night, Philadelphia would end up trading away some of their second round picks in exchange for future assets, while also gaining a first round pick from the Orlando Magic in the process. In exchange for giving up a protected first round pick of sorts and a 2020 second round pick, the 76ers acquired the Magic's 25th pick, which became the Latvian center Anžejs Pasečņiks of the Herbalife Gran Canaria out in Spain. Throughout his international career, he became a three-time champion in his native land of Latvia before winning a Spanish championship and being named a member of the Liga ACB's All-Young Players Team in more recent years. After that, for the first of Philadelphia's own second round draft picks this year, they selected the Australian power forward Jonah Bolden, a former UCLA student before recently playing for the KK FMP Beograd out in Serbia. While not being particularly special at UCLA, Bolden received a second wind in Serbia by averaging 12.9 points, 7.2 rebounds, 1.8 assists, 1.0 steal, and 1.0 block per game with the FMP Beograd, which earned him the honor of being the Adriatic League's Top Prospect that year. After that, they would trade their next two second round picks (sophomore point guard Jawun Evans of Oklahoma State University and senior shooting guard Sterling Brown of Southern Methodist University respectively) to the Los Angeles Clippers and Milwaukee Bucks respectively in exchange for cash considerations that'd be had for usage once again on July 1. Finally, with their last second round pick, the 76ers selected the Martinique born French power forward Mathias Lessort of the Nanterre 92 in France's LNB Pro A. In his professional career out in France, Lessort won co-Sixth Man of the Year honors with Matt Howard back with Élan Chalon in 2016 before recently winning the French Basketball Cup and FIBA Europe Cup championships with the Nanterre 92.

Game log

Preseason

|- style="background:#fcc;"
| 1
| October 4
| Memphis
| 
| Covington, Okafor (13)
| Ben Simmons (7)
| Ben Simmons (9)
| Wells Fargo Center18,102
| 0–1
|- style="background:#fcc;"
| 2
| October 6
| Boston
| 
| Jerryd Bayless (15)
| Robert Covington (7)
| McConnell, Simmons (5)
| Wells Fargo Center17,668
| 0–2
|- style="background:#fcc;"
| 3
| October 9
| @ Boston
| 
| Ben Simmons (15)
| Johnson, Saric (7)
| T. J. McConnell (4)
| TD Garden18,624
| 0–3
|- style="background:#cfc;"
| 4
| October 11
| @ Brooklyn
| 
| Dario Saric (26)
| Dario Saric (9)
| Ben Simmons (6)
| Nassau Veterans Memorial ColiseumN/A
| 1–3
|- style="background:#cfc;"
| 5
| October 13
| Miami
| 
| McConnell, Simmons (19)
| Covington, Embiid, Simmons (7)
| Ben Simmons (5)
| Sprint Center11,249
| 2–3

Regular season

|- style="background:#fcc;"
| 1
| October 18
| @ Washington
| 
| Robert Covington (29)
| Joel Embiid (13)
| Ben Simmons (5)
| Capital One Arena20,356
| 0–1
|- style="background:#fcc;"
| 2
| October 20
| Boston
| 
| JJ Redick (19)
| Joel Embiid (14)
| Ben Simmons (5)
| Wells Fargo Center20,816
| 0–2
|- style="background:#fcc;"
| 3
| October 21
| @ Toronto
| 
| Ben Simmons (18)
| Ben Simmons (10)
| Ben Simmons (8)
| Air Canada Centre19,800
| 0–3
|- style="background:#cfc;"
| 4
| October 23
| @  Detroit
| 
| Joel Embiid (30)
| Ben Simmons (12)
| Ben Simmons (10)
| Little Caesars Arena13,709
| 1–3
|- style="background:#fcc;"
| 5
| October 25
| Houston
| 
| JJ Redick (22)
| Johnson, Simmons (7)
| McConnell, Simmons (9)
| Wells Fargo Center20,682
| 1–4
|- style="background:#cfc;"
| 6
| October 28
| @ Dallas
| 
| Embiid, Simmons (23)
| Joel Embiid (9)
| Ben Simmons (8)
| American Airlines Center19,567
| 2–4
|- style="background:#cfc;"
| 7
| October 30
| @ Houston
| 
| Joel Embiid (22)
| Amir Johnson (10)
| Ben Simmons (9)
| Toyota Center16,714
| 3–4

|- style="background:#cfc;"
| 8
| November 1
| Atlanta
| 
| Robert Covington (22)
| Ben Simmons (13)
| Ben Simmons (9)
| Wells Fargo Center20,549
| 4–4
|- style="background:#cfc;"
| 9
| November 3
| Indiana
| 
| JJ Redick (31)
| Ben Simmons (11)
| Ben Simmons (11)
| Wells Fargo Center20,668
| 5–4
|- style="background:#cfc;"
| 10
| November 7
| @ Utah
| 
| Dario Saric (25)
| Ben Simmons (13)
| T. J. McConnell (8)
| Vivint Smart Home Arena16,063
| 6–4
|- style="background:#fcc;"
| 11
| November 9
| @ Sacramento
| 
| Robert Covington (24)
| Joel Embiid (15)
| McConnell, Simmons (6)
| Golden 1 Center17,583
| 6–5
|- style="background:#fcc;"
| 12
| November 11
| @ Golden State
| 
| JJ Redick (17)
| Joel Embiid (7)
| Ben Simmons (8)
| Oracle Arena19,596
| 6–6
|- style="background:#cfc;"
| 13
| November 13
| @ L.A. Clippers
| 
| Joel Embiid (32)
| Joel Embiid (16)
| McConnell, Redick (6)
| Staples Center  19,068
| 7–6
|- style="background:#cfc;"
| 14
| November 15
| @ L.A. Lakers
| 
| Joel Embiid (46)
| Joel Embiid (15)
| Ben Simmons (10)
| Staples Center18,997
| 8–6
|- style="background:#fcc;"
| 15
| November 18
| Golden State
| 
| Ben Simmons (23)
| Dario Saric (10)
| Ben Simmons (12)
| Wells Fargo Center20,848
| 8–7
|- style="background:#cfc;"
| 16
| November 20
| Utah
| 
| Ben Simmons (27)
| Joel Embiid (11)
| T. J. McConnell (5)
| Wells Fargo Center20,587
| 9–7
|- style="background:#cfc;"
| 17
| November 22
| Portland
| 
| Joel Embiid (28)
| Joel Embiid (12)
| Ben Simmons (9)
| Wells Fargo Center20,605
| 10–7
|- style="background:#cfc;"
| 18
| November 25
| Orlando
| 
| JJ Redick (29)
| Joel Embiid (14)
| T. J. McConnell (13)
| Wells Fargo Center20,585
| 11–7
|- style="background:#fcc;"
| 19
| November 27
| Cleveland
| 
| Joel Embiid (30)
| Joel Embiid (11)
| Robert Covington (4)
| Wells Fargo Center20,527
| 11–8
|- style="background:#cfc;"
| 20
| November 29
| Washington
| 
| Ben Simmons (31)
| Ben Simmons (18)
| Bayless, Embiid, Redick, Simmons (4)
| Wells Fargo Center20,492
| 12–8
|- style="background:#fcc;"
| 21
| November 30
| @ Boston
| 
| Dario Saric (18)
| Dario Saric (10)
| Ben Simmons (7)
| TD Garden18,624
| 12–9

|- style="background:#cfc;"
| 22
| December 2
| Detroit
| 
| Covington, Embiid (25)
| Embiid, Simmons (10)
| JJ Redick (7)
| Wells Fargo Center20,562
| 13–9
|- style="background:#fcc;"
| 23
| December 4
| Phoenix
| 
| JJ Redick (25)
| Joel Embiid (12)
| Ben Simmons (7)
| Wells Fargo Center20,564
| 13–10
|- style="background:#fcc;"
| 24
| December 7
| L.A. Lakers
| 
| Joel Embiid (33)
| Ben Simmons (13)
| Ben Simmons (15)
| Wells Fargo Center20,495
| 13–11
|- style="background:#fcc;"
| 25
| December 9
| @ Cleveland
| 
| Covington, Redick (19)
| Dario Saric (9)
| Ben Simmons (10)
| Quicken Loans Arena20,562
| 13–12
|- style="background:#fcc;"
| 26
| December 10
| @ New Orleans
| 
| JJ Redick (28)
| Dario Saric (11)
| Ben Simmons (10)
| Smoothie King Center16,878
| 13–13
|- style="background:#cfc;"
| 27
| December 12
| @ Minnesota
| 
| Joel Embiid (28)
| Joel Embiid (12)
| Embiid, Simmons (8)
| Target Center14,659
| 14–13
|- style="background:#fcc;"
| 28
| December 15
| Oklahoma City
| 
| Joel Embiid (34)
| Robert Covington (10)
| Ben Simmons (11)
| Wells Fargo Center20,612
| 14–14
|- style="background:#fcc;"
| 29
| December 18
| @ Chicago
| 
| Dario Saric (27)
| Ben Simmons (11)
| Ben Simmons (9)
| United Center20,796
| 14–15
|- style="background:#fcc;"
| 30
| December 19
| Sacramento
| 
| Robert Covington (17)
| Ben Simmons (12)
| Ben Simmons (9)
| Wells Fargo Center20,558
| 14–16
|- style="background:#fcc;"
| 31
| December 21
| Toronto
| 
| Ben Simmons (20)
| Dario Saric (10)
| Dario Saric (9)
| Wells Fargo Center20,680
| 14–17
|- style="background:#fcc;
| 32
| December 23
| @ Toronto
| 
| Dario Saric (17)
| Joel Embiid (8)
| Ben Simmons (6)
| Air Canada Centre19,800
| 14–18
|- style="background:#cfc;"
| 33
| December 25
| @ New York
| 
| Joel Embiid (25)
| Joel Embiid (16)
| T. J. McConnell (4)
| Madison Square Garden19,812
| 15–18
|- style="background:#fcc;"
| 34
| December 28
| @ Portland
| 
| Joel Embiid (29)
| Embiid, Saric (9)
| Ben Simmons (8)
| Moda Center20,104
| 15–19
|- style="background:#cfc;"
| 35
| December 30
| @ Denver
| 
| Dario Saric (20)
| Joel Embiid (10)
| T. J. McConnell (8)
| Pepsi Center19,599
| 16–19
|- style="background:#cfc;"
| 36
| December 31
| @ Phoenix
| 
| Dario Saric (27)
| Joel Embiid (9)
| Ben Simmons (6)
| Talking Stick Resort Arena16,983
| 17–19

|- style="background:#cfc;"
| 37
| January 3
| San Antonio
| 
| Ben Simmons (26)
| Joel Embiid (11)
| Embiid, McConnell, Simmons, Redick (4)
| Wells Fargo Center20,642
| 18–19
|- style="background:#cfc"
| 38
| January 5
| Detroit
| 
| Joel Embiid (23)
| Joel Embiid (9)
| Ben Simmons (9)
| Wells Fargo Center20,592
| 19–19
|- style="background:#fcc"
| 39
| January 11
| Boston
| 
| JJ Redick (22)
| Joel Embiid (10)
| Embiid, McConnell (5)
| The O2 Arena19.078
| 19–20
|- style="background:#cfc"
| 40
| January 15
| Toronto
| 
| Joel Embiid (34)
| Joel Embiid (11)
| T. J. McConnell (8)
| Wells Fargo Center20,637
| 20–20
|- style="background:#cfc"
| 41
| January 18
| @ Boston
| 
| Joel Embiid (26)
| Joel Embiid (16)
| Joel Embiid (6)
| TD Garden18,624
| 21–20
|- style="background:#cfc"
| 42
| January 20
| Milwaukee
| 
| Joel Embiid (29)
| Joel Embiid (9)
| Ben Simmons (9)
| Wells Fargo Center20,826
| 22–20
|- style="background:#fcc"
| 43
| January 22
| @ Memphis
| 
| Dario Saric (22)
| Joel Embiid (14)
| Ben Simmons (7)
| FedExForum14,288
| 22–21
|- style="background:#cfc"
| 44
| January 24
| Chicago
| 
| Joel Embiid (22)
| Ben Simmons (17)
| Ben Simmons (14)
| Wells Fargo Center20,547
| 23–21
|- style="background:#cfc"
| 45
| January 26
| @ San Antonio
| 
| Ben Simmons (21)
| Joel Embiid (14)
| Ben Simmons (7)
| AT&T Center18,418
| 24–21
|- style="background:#fcc"
| 46
| January 28
| @ Oklahoma City
| 
| Joel Embiid (27)
| Joel Embiid (10)
| Ben Simmons (7)
| Chesapeake Energy Arena18,203
| 24–22
|- style="background:#fcc"
| 47
| January 29
| @ Milwaukee
| 
| Dario Saric (19)
| Dario Saric (9)
| Ben Simmons (5)
| BMO Harris Bradley Center14,126
| 24–23
|- style="background:#fcc"
| 48
| January 31
| @ Brooklyn
| 
| Joel Embiid (29)
| Joel Embiid (14)
| Ben Simmons (7)
| Barclays Center15,577
| 24–24

|- style="background:#cfc"
| 49
| February 2
| Miami
| 
| Ben Simmons (20)
| Joel Embiid (11)
| McConnell, Simmons (5)
| Wells Fargo Center20,636
| 25–24
|- style="background:#fcc"
| 50
| February 3
| @ Indiana
| 
| Joel Embiid (24)
| Ben Simmons (11)
| Ben Simmons (6)
| Bankers Life Fieldhouse17,923
| 25–25
|- style="background:#cfc"
| 51
| February 6
| Washington
| 
| Joel Embiid (27)
| Joel Embiid (12)
| Ben Simmons (8)
| Wells Fargo Center20,530
| 26–25
|- style="background:#cfc"
| 52
| February 9
| New Orleans
| 
| Embiid, Saric (24)
| Joel Embiid (16)
| Ben Simmons (8)
| Wells Fargo Center20,489
| 27–25
|- style="background:#cfc"
| 53
| February 10
| LA Clippers
| 
| Joel Embiid (29)
| Joel Embiid (16)
| Ben Simmons (10)
| Wells Fargo Center20,504
| 28–25
|- style="background:#cfc"
| 54
| February 12
| NY Knicks
| 
| Dario Saric (24)
| T. J. McConnell (10)
| T. J. McConnell (11)
| Wells Fargo Center20,589
| 29–25
|- style="background:#cfc"
| 55
| February 14
| Miami
| 
| Dario Saric (19)
| Ben Simmons (12)
| Ben Simmons (10)
| Wells Fargo Center20,492
| 30–25
|- style="background:#cfc"
| 56
| February 22
| @ Chicago
| 
| Ben Simmons (32)
| Joel Embiid (13)
| Ben Simmons (11)
| United Center21,312
| 31–25
|- style="background:#cfc"
| 57
| February 24
| Orlando
| 
| Joel Embiid (28)
| Joel Embiid (14)
| Ben Simmons (7)
| Wells Fargo Center20,594
| 32–25
|- style="background:#fcc"
| 58
| February 25
| @ Washington
| 
| Joel Embiid (25)
| Joel Embiid (10)
| Ben Simmons (8)
| Capital One Arena17,180
| 32–26
|- style="background:#fcc"
| 59
| February 27
| @ Miami
| 
| Joel Embiid (23)
| Joel Embiid (8)
| Ben Simmons (6)
| American Airlines Arena19,600
| 32–27

|- style="background:#cfc"
| 60
| March 1
| @ Cleveland
| 
| JJ Redick (22)
| Joel Embiid (14)
| Ben Simmons (8)
| Quicken Loans Arena20,562
| 33–27
|- style="background:#cfc"
| 61
| March 2
| Charlotte
| 
| Joel Embiid (23)
| Joel Embiid (14)
| Ben Simmons (6)
| Wells Fargo Center20,487
| 34–27
|- style="background:#fcc"
| 62
| March 4
| @ Milwaukee
| 
| Dario Saric (25)
| Joel Embiid (8)
| Ben Simmons (15)
| Bradley Center15,587
| 34–28
|- style="background:#cfc"
| 63
| March 6
| @ Charlotte
| 
| Robert Covington (22)
| Ben Simmons (8)
| Ben Simmons (13)
| Spectrum Center15,600
| 35–28
|- style="background:#fcc"
| 64
| March 8
| @ Miami
| 
| Dario Saric (20)
| Dario Saric (10)
| Ben Simmons (8)
| American Airlines Arena19,600
| 35–29
|- style="background:#cfc"
| 65
| March 11
| @ Brooklyn
| 
| Joel Embiid (21)
| Ersan Ilyasova (13)
| McConnell, Simmons (6)
| Barclays Center16,901
| 36–29
|- style="background:#fcc"
| 66
| March 13
| Indiana
| 
| Joel Embiid (29)
| Ben Simmons (13)
| Ben Simmons (10)
| Wells Fargo Center20,531
| 36–30
|- style="background:#cfc"
| 67
| March 15
| @ NY Knicks
| 
| Joel Embiid (29)
| Dario Saric (12)
| Ben Simmons (12)
| Madison Square Garden18,894
| 37–30
|- style="background:#cfc"
| 68
| March 16
| Brooklyn
| 
| Joel Embiid (24)
| Joel Embiid (19)
| Ben Simmons (12)
| Wells Fargo Center20,666
| 38–30
|- style="background:#cfc"
| 69
| March 19
| Charlotte
| 
| Joel Embiid (25)
| Joel Embiid (19)
| Ben Simmons (15)
| Wells Fargo Center20,530
| 39–30
|- style="background:#cfc"
| 70
| March 21
| Memphis
| 
| Covington, Saric, Redick, Belinelli (15)
| Simmons, Embiid (7)
| Ben Simmons (9)
| Wells Fargo Center10,411
| 40–30
|- style="background:#cfc"
| 71
| March 22
| @ Orlando
| 
| Ersan Ilyasova (18)
| Ben Simmons (11)
| Ben Simmons (10)
| Amway Center 17,881
| 41–30
|- style="background:#cfc"
| 72
| March 24
| Minnesota
| 
| Joel Embiid (19)
| Ben Simmons (12)
| Ben Simmons (13)
| Wells Fargo Center20,668
| 42–30
|- style="background:#cfc"
| 73
| March 26
| Denver
| 
| Saric, Embiid (20)
| Embiid, Simmons (13)
| Ben Simmons (11)
| Wells Fargo Center20,585
| 43–30
|- style="background:#cfc"
| 74
| March 28
| NY Knicks
| 
| Dario Saric (26)
| Dario Saric (14)
| Ben Simmons (10)
| Wells Fargo Center20,655
| 44–30
|- style="background:#cfc"
| 75
| March 30
| @ Atlanta
| 
| Ersan Ilyasova (21)
| Ersan Ilyasova (16)
| Ben Simmons (11)
| Philips Arena16,579
| 45–30

|- style="background:#cfc"
| 76
| April 1
| @ Charlotte
| 
| Marco Belinelli (22)
| Robert Covington (11)
| Ben Simmons (15)
| Spectrum Center17,005
| 46–30
|- style="background:#cfc"
| 77
| April 3
| Brooklyn
| 
| JJ Redick (19)
| Ersan Ilyasova (13)
| Simmons, Johnson (6)
| Wells Fargo Center20,710
| 47–30
|- style="background:#cfc"
| 78
| April 4
| @ Detroit
| 
| JJ Redick (25)
| Ersan Ilyasova (11)
| Ben Simmons (7)
| Little Caesars Arena18,395
| 48–30
|- style="background:#cfc"
| 79
| April 6
| Cleveland
| 
| JJ Redick (28)
| Ben Simmons (15)
| Ben Simmons (13)
| Wells Fargo Center20,769
| 49–30
|- style="background:#cfc"
| 80
| April 8
| Dallas
| 
| JJ Redick (18)
| Ersan Ilyasova (12)
| Ben Simmons (9)
| Wells Fargo Center20,846
| 50–30
|- style="background:#cfc"
| 81
| April 10
| @ Atlanta
| 
| JJ Redick (28)
| Ben Simmons (10)
| Ben Simmons (9)
| Philips Arena15,673
| 51–30
|- style="background:#cfc"
| 82
| April 11
| Milwaukee
| 
| Justin Anderson (25)
| Markelle Fultz (10)
| Markelle Fultz (10)
| Wells Fargo Center20,659
| 52–30

Playoffs

|- style="background:#cfc;"
| 1
| April 14
| Miami
| 
| JJ Redick (28)
| Ersan Ilyasova (14)
| Ben Simmons (14)
| Wells Fargo Center20,617
| 1–0
|- style="background:#fcc;"
| 2
| April 16
| Miami
| 
| Ben Simmons (24)
| Ersan Ilyasova (11)
| Ben Simmons (8)
| Wells Fargo Center20,753
| 1–1
|- style="background:#cfc;"
| 3
| April 19
| @ Miami
| 
| Joel Embiid (23)
| Ben Simmons (12)
| Ben Simmons (7)
| American Airlines Arena19,812
| 2–1
|- style="background:#cfc;"
| 4
| April 21
| @ Miami
| 
| JJ Redick (24)
| Ben Simmons (13)
| Ben Simmons (10)
| American Airlines Arena19,804
| 3–1
|- style="background:#cfc;"
| 5
| April 24
| Miami
| 
| JJ Redick (27)
| Joel Embiid (12)
| Ben Simmons (6)
| Wells Fargo Center21,171
| 4–1

|- style="background:#fcc;"
| 1
| April 30
| @ Boston
| 
| Joel Embiid (31)
| Joel Embiid (13)
| Ben Simmons (6)
| TD Garden18,624
| 0–1
|- style="background:#fcc;"
| 2
| May 3
| @ Boston
| 
| JJ Redick (23)
| Joel Embiid (14)
| Ben Simmons (7)
| TD Garden18,624
| 0–2
|- style="background:#fcc;"
| 3
| May 5
| Boston
| 
| Joel Embiid (22)
| Joel Embiid (19)
| Ben Simmons (8)
| Wells Fargo Center20,758
| 0–3
|- style="background:#cfc;"
| 4
| May 7
| Boston
| 
| Dario Šarić (25)
| Embiid, Simmons (13)
| McConnell, Simmons (5)
| Wells Fargo Center20,936
| 1–3
|- style="background:#fcc;"
| 5
| May 9
| @ Boston
| 
| Embiid, Šarić (27)
| Joel Embiid (12)
| McConnell, Simmons (6)
| TD Garden18,624
| 1–4

Standings

Atlantic division

Conference standings

Roster

<noinclude>

Transactions

Trades

Free agents

Re-signed

Additions

Subtractions

Awards and honors

References

Philadelphia 76ers seasons
Philadelphia 76ers
Philadelphia 76ers
Philadelphia 76ers